Garalamadugu is a village in Kadapa district of the Indian state of Andhra Pradesh. The Village is popularly known as Malluvari Palli. It is located in Pullampeta mandal of Rajampeta revenue division. In this village there are nearly 150 houses.

Geography

Demographics 
Garalamadugu has a population of 505 as of 2011 census, of which males constitute 261, and females 244. Literacy rate stands at 63.33%.

References 

Villages in Kadapa district